Biava is an Italian surname. Notable people with the surname include:

Fabrizio Biava (born 1983), Italian footballer
Giuseppe Biava (born 1977), Italian footballer
Vincenzo Biava (1916–2004), Italian sport shooter
Pier Mario Biava, Italian cancer researcher

Italian-language surnames